Roger Steinmann ([ʁɔ.ʒe ʃtaɪ̯nman]; born November 6, 1961, in Zurich, Switzerland) is a creative in film and theater and an entrepreneur.

Most notable is his biopic Illusion Infinity (aka Paradise, 2004), starring Dee Wallace, Mickey Rooney, Timothy Bottoms, Barbara Carrera, Martin Kove, Theresa Saldana, and Lilyan Chauvin.

In autumn 2018, the shooting of the international feature film, the farce-comedy PhonY, had to be interrupted due to the unexpected death of lead actor Burt Reynolds. Since then, and underlined by the outbreak of the Covid-19-panic, the fate of the already to 70% shot farce-comedy became uncertain.

In spring of 2020, during the worldwide film stop caused by the COVID-19 crisis, Steinmann turned to the theater and created the two-character farce WIN=WIN.  Subsequently, he directed and produced the play; the premiere was held in Zurich on October 7, 2022.  On stage were Bodo Krumwiede and Florine Elena Deplazes; the off-roles were voiced by Christa Rigozzi, Gilles Tschudi, René Rindlisbacher, Heidi Maria Glössner and Bella Neri.

Early life 
At the age of 12, Steinman shot his first short film with a Super-8 camera. In the next five years, another 30 films followed. Four of them received awards.

One of the early award-winning films was Die Maschinentiere (The Machine Animals), a 1977-documentary on large-scale animal husbandry in contrast to classic farming.

In Die Flutkatastrophe (The Flood Disaster) Steinmann showed the consequences of a broken dam of a nearby reservoir and the flooding of his hometown Zurich. Along an interview, it was aired on Swiss TV in November 1978, the month Steinmann turned 17.

Career

Progressing Film Ambitions 
Still in his teens, Steinmann aimed to execute larger scale feature-projects based on his original screenplays. In 1978/79, he developed the conception Krebs! (Cancer!) about the life-threatening virus in a woman's organism, visualized by a simultaneous life-threat of the organism of an entire city by a Godzilla-like monster-crab. In German language the title "Krebs!" bears the double meaning of Cancer and Crab.

Early Theater activities 
Steinmann turned to theater as well; notable are:

1982: Beschti Referenze (aka Buchhalter Noetzli / Bookkeeper Noetzli), Steinmann in his function as producer and director was the first to bring this play by Hans Schubert to the Swiss stage. Four years later, the same play served the popular Swiss folk actor Walter Roderer as was his probably greatest success, on stage as well as in film. 

1986: Achtung-Fertig-Los! (aka Nume Theater mit em Sunntigsbsuech / Ready-Steady-Go!), Steinmann producing and writing this unique farce-comedy concepting disguised actors among the real audience.  His friend Markus Imthurn was directing, becoming Steinmann's closest artistic collaborator to date. 

1988: Schelmereie (Sweet Cheating) at the theater in Oberentfelden, Switzerland: Steinmann directing.

Hollywood 
From 1991, Steinmann lived alternatively in Los Angeles. There, he wrote several screenplays on spec, alone but mostly in association, e.g. 'Bum and the Kid' with Scott Steindorff, outlines, e.g. ‘Love of my Life’ with Don Mankiewicz, rewrites, e.g. ‘Project: Metalbeast’.

Feature Film Illusion Infinity (aka Paradise, 2004) 
Among Steinmann´s several projects, Illusion Infinity (aka Paradise, 2004) caught the eye of casting director Gerald I. Wolff. He was able to engage seven well known Hollywood actors: Dee Wallace, Mickey Rooney, Timothy Bottoms, Barbara Carrera, Martin Kove, Theresa Saldana, and Lilyan Chauvin.

Illusion Infinity was labeled as biopic; however, it was an original screenplay by Steinmann about the supposed real Las Vegas singer Patricia Paradise (played by Dee Wallace) and her life-long search for a genuine soul-mate, and a home she calls ‘Shangri-La’.

Feature Film Projects ‘The PartyKillers’ and ‘Ladies First’ 
In 2014, Thai film star Mike Angelo became interested to star in ‘The PartyKillers’, a screwball-comedy about a humble inventor of a magical teddy-bear crashing the engagement party of a toy manufacturer. This screenplay Steinmann wrote back in 1995/98 in collaboration with Rodney Heeringa.

But another concept of a screwball comedy fit Angelo's talent even better: A male singer gaining success only when performing as a woman, attracting both a father and his daughter. After Angelo agreed to star in this dual role, Steinmann originated the 2015-screenplay ‘Ladies First’. Swiss actors Beat Schlatter and Pascal Ulli confirmed their interest to participate, the latter also as co-produce.

Feature Film PhonY 

Our world caught up with constant (ab-)use of cellphones: What would happen if all cells and computers became unusable? This topic led to the 2016/2018-screenplay PhonY with the unique interactivity between segments in Los Angeles, Switzerland, Australia, Thailand and Canada.

In spring 2018, the filming commenced in Switzerland with Pascal Ulli and Gilles Tschudi; it was followed by the Thai segment with a local cast. The remaining segments with Burt Reynolds, Talia Shire and Barbara Carrera were scheduled in Los Angeles for October 2018. Though, a mere month before, Reynolds untimely passed away, and the production stalled. Golden Globe Award winners Arnold Schwarzenegger and Elke Sommer were set for the reshoot, with Shire still on board - however, the restrictions of the Corona panic once again ruined the shooting scheduled of April 2020.  Since then, the fate of the feature film, shot to 70%, has become uncertain.

Stage Production WIN=WIN 
 Due to the cinematic inactivity in spring 2020, Steinmann turned after a hiatus of more than 30 years once again to the theater and created WIN=WIN, a two-person farce about the 'panic-stricken' distancing - aka 'social distancing' - of two very different neighbors.  The stage is set up two-parted, thus the two protagonists' actions is viewed simultaneously.  

Casting with Bodo Krumwiede and Florine Elena Deplazes were completed by the end of April 2022, rehearsal began at the end of June and the world premiere of WIN=WIN took place on October 7, 2022, in Zurich. 

In addition to the Swiss production, international actors such as Didi Hallervorden and, shortly before his death, Karl Dall along, for the English adaptation, Timothy Bottoms are interested in a respective national premiere of WIN=WIN.

Renewed Theater Activities 
In 2020/21, Steinmann modernized his 1986-stage play Achtung-Fertig-Los! anew as NUME THEATER MIT EM SUNNTIGSBSUECH (and in the High German version as NUR THEATER MIT DEM SONNTAGSBESUCH).  To this 11-person-farce comedy, an entirely new second and third act was added.

Two original plays followed: the crime comedy WENN DER DRILLING MIT DER ZWILLING (only in German to date) and the One-Lady drama THE DIARY OF RUTH MADOFF based on its German-texted original DAS TAGEBUCH DER RUTH MADOFF (all working titles to date).

The Madoff-play is in preparation for a world premiere for the 2023/24 theater season, either in the German-speaking territories, or, in the English adaptation, in the United States.  Steinmann will serve as director and producer/co-producer.

Other activities
1981: Steinmann concluded his education at the Swiss Business School in Zurich.

1983: Steinmann invented an automatic bottle stopper; patented in 1985.

1983: Steinmann prevailed in the German TV-quiz show ‘Alles oder Nichts’ and won DM 10'000.

1984: Steinmann founded the Rotsch AG, a joint-stock company, to market his invention. At that time, he was 22 years old and became the youngest president ever of such an entity in Switzerland. He sold that entity in 1996.

1986: Steinmann started distributing greeting cards, partly of own designing, in Switzerland but as well in Europe and throughout the world. His products were among the most luxurious cards on the market.

1995: Steinmann founded the film production company SUNSET International AG, a joint-stock film production company, among others of the current PhonY.

2022: Steinmann's life in his home of choice Phuket was aired in Europe's largest TV-station RTL in three installments within the popular docu-series Die Alltagskämpfer.

Filmography (selection)

Film

Theater (selection) 

1982: Beschti Referenze (aka ‘Buchhalter Noetzli’; directed and produced)
1986: Achtung-Fertig-Los! (aka Nume Theater mit em Sunntigsbsuech'; written and produced)
1988: Schelmereie (1988; directed)
2020/21: Nume Theater with em Sunntigsbsuech (aka 'Nur Theater mit dem Sonntagsbesuch, new adaptation of the 1986-play)

 2020/21: WIN=WIN (original book in German as well as adaptation in English; production and direction, premiere in Zurich 7.10.2022)

 2022: WENN DER DRILLING MIT DER ZWILLING (original book, crime comedy)

 2023: THE DIARY OF RUTH MADOFF (working title; English adaption from the original in German DAS TAGEBUCH DER RUTH MADOFF; one-lady drama; production and direction in preparation for 2023/24)

Unproduced screenplays (selection) 

Krebs! (1978)
Serendipity (1991), co-written with/by James Valentine
Bum and the Kid (1992), co-written with/by Robert Scott Steindorff, story by Steindorff
Love of my Life (1993), co-written with/by Don Mankiewicz, story by Steinmann/Mario Gmür
The PartyKillers (1995/2014), story with/by Rodney Heeringa, Markus Imthurn and Sidonia Held (in development)
Ladies First (2015) (in development)

References

External links 
 
 
 
PhonY official website

Living people
1961 births
Swiss film producers
Swiss film directors
Swiss screenwriters
Male screenwriters
20th-century Swiss inventors
Swiss business executives